Articerodes jariyae is a rove beetle discovered in Thailand in 2008. It was named for Professor Jariya Chanpaisaen, who collaborated on the study that located it. It is closely related to Articerodes ohmomoi and Articerodes thailandicus, discovered during the same study.

References

Insects of Thailand
Clavigeritae